Didymosphenia is a genus of diatoms belonging to the family Cymbellaceae.

The genus has almost cosmopolitan distribution.

Species:

Didymosphenia fossilis 
Didymosphenia geminata 
Didymosphenia lineata 
Didymosphenia pumila 
Didymosphenia sublinearis 
Didymosphenia tatrensis

References

Cymbellales
Diatom genera